Stefano Negro (born 28 June 1995) is an Italian professional footballer player who plays as a centre-back for  club Pordenone.

Club career
On 28 January 2020, Negro joined Viterbese on loan. On 16 September 2020, he moved to Perugia on a one-year loan.

On 31 August 2021, Negro moved to Triestina on a permanent deal.

On 19 July 2022, Negro signed a two-year contract with Pordenone.

References

External links
 

1995 births
Living people
People from Biella
Sportspeople from the Province of Biella
Footballers from Piedmont
Italian footballers
Association football central defenders
Serie B players
Serie C players
A.S. Pro Piacenza 1919 players
F.C. Pro Vercelli 1892 players
A.C. Monza players
U.S. Viterbese 1908 players
A.C. Perugia Calcio players
U.S. Triestina Calcio 1918 players
Pordenone Calcio players